The Duke of York is a former coaching inn at Ganwick Corner on the section of the Great North Road now known as Barnet Road, between Chipping Barnet and Potters Bar. It is grade II listed.

The pub was licensed in 1752.

References

External links 

https://www.brunningandprice.co.uk/dukeofyork/
http://edithsstreets.blogspot.com/2016/12/m25-ganwick-corner.html

Coaching inns
Grade II listed pubs in Hertfordshire